Manila is a city in Mississippi County, Arkansas, United States. The population was 3,682 at the 2020 census, up from 3,342 in 2010. It was the hometown of World War I sniper Herman Davis. A park in the town honors his memory.

History
Manila has its origins in a herdsman's camp established by John Needham in the late 1860s. By the late 1890s, a community known as "Cinda" (named after an early postmaster's sister) had developed in the area. In 1901, this community incorporated as a city, and chose the name "Manila" to honor Commodore George Dewey's 1898 victory in the Battle of Manila Bay during the Spanish–American War.

In the early 1900s, the Jonesboro, Lake City and Eastern Railroad (later part of the St. Louis-San Francisco Railway system) extended a rail line to Manila. In 1910, the Manila Depot was constructed by the railroad. This train station now serves as a museum, and is listed on the National Register of Historic Places.

Geography
Manila is located in northwestern Mississippi County in the Arkansas Delta region at  (35.879876, −90.169538).

Ecologically, Manila is located within the St. Francis Lowlands ecoregion within the larger Mississippi Alluvial Plain. The St. Francis Lowlands are a flat region mostly covered with row crop agriculture today, though also containing sand blows and sunken lands remaining from the 1811–12 New Madrid earthquakes. Waterways have mostly been channelized, causing loss of aquatic and riparian wildlife habitat. The Big Lake National Wildlife Refuge, which preserves some of the bottomland hardwood forest typical of this ecoregion prior to development for row agriculture lies just east of Manila.

Demographics

2020 census

As of the 2020 United States census, there were 3,682 people, 1,347 households, and 863 families residing in the city.

2000 census
As of the census of 2000, there were 3,055 people, 1,214 households, and 842 families residing in the city. The racial makeup of the city was 98.20% White, 0.03% Black or African American, 0.39% Native American, 0.07% Asian, 0.26% from other races, and 1.05% from two or more races.  1.08% of the population were Hispanic or Latino of any race.

There were 1,214 households, out of which 34.1% had children under the age of 18 living with them, 55.8% were married couples living together, 10.0% had a female householder with no husband present, and 30.6% were non-families. 27.4% of all households were made up of individuals, and 14.6% had someone living alone who was 65 years of age or older.  The average household size was 2.47 and the average family size was 3.02.

In the city, the population was spread out, with 25.9% under the age of 18, 8.6% from 18 to 24, 28.0% from 25 to 44, 21.6% from 45 to 64, and 15.9% who were 65 years of age or older.  The median age was 36 years. For every 100 females, there were 89.3 males.  For every 100 females age 18 and over, there were 85.6 males.

The median income for a household in the city was $24,896, and the median income for a family was $33,105. Males had a median income of $31,344 versus $19,063 for females. The per capita income for the city was $13,754.  About 13.4% of families and 18.4% of the population were below the poverty line, including 18.6% of those under age 18 and 26.4% of those age 65 or over.

Climate
The climate in this area is characterized by hot, humid summers and generally mild to cool winters.  According to the Köppen Climate Classification system, Manila has a humid subtropical climate, abbreviated "Cfa" on climate maps.

Notable people
Cloria Brown, Missouri state legislator
Honey Bruce, stripper and showgirl
Jerry Jaye, singer
Wayne Wagner, state legislator and mayor
Mel Wright, baseball player and coach

References

External links

Cities in Arkansas
Cities in Mississippi County, Arkansas